The crucifixion and death of Jesus occurred in 1st-century Judea, most likely in 30 CE or 33 CE. It is described in the four canonical gospels, referred to in the New Testament epistles, attested to by other ancient sources, and considered an established historical event. There is no consensus among historians on the details.

In the canonical gospels, Jesus is arrested and tried by the Sanhedrin, and then by Pontius Pilate, who sentences him to flagellation and finally crucifixion by the Roman Empire.

Jesus was stripped of his clothing and offered vinegar mixed with myrrh or gall (likely posca), to drink. He was then hung between two convicted thieves and, according to the Gospel of Mark, died by the 9th hour of the day (at around 3:00 p.m.). During this time, the soldiers affixed a sign to the top of the cross stating "Jesus of Nazareth, King of the Jews" which, according to the Gospel of John (John 19:20), was written in three languages (Hebrew, Latin, and Greek). They then divided his garments among themselves and cast lots for his seamless robe, according to the Gospel of John. The Gospel of John also states that, after Jesus' death, one soldier (named in extra-Biblical tradition as Longinus) pierced his side with a spear to be certain that he had died, then blood and water gushed from the wound. The Bible describes seven statements that Jesus made while he was on the cross, as well as several supernatural events that occurred. Among the eyewitnesses named in the gospels are Mary Magdalene, Mary, mother of Jesus, Mary of Clopas, and Salome, often identified as the wife of Zebedee.

Collectively referred to as the Passion, Jesus' suffering and redemptive death by crucifixion are the central aspects of Christian theology concerning the doctrines of salvation and atonement. In Islam Jesus' importance as a religious figure is acknowledged, but his death by crucifixion is rejected and sometimes explained as a mistaken interpretation of events.

New Testament narratives

The earliest detailed accounts of the death of Jesus are contained in the four canonical gospels. There are other, more implicit references in the New Testament epistles. In the synoptic gospels, Jesus predicts his death in three separate places. All four Gospels conclude with an extended narrative of Jesus' arrest, initial trial at the Sanhedrin and final trial at Pilate's court, where Jesus is flogged, condemned to death, is led to the place of crucifixion initially carrying his cross before Roman soldiers induce Simon of Cyrene to carry it, and then Jesus is crucified, entombed, and resurrected from the dead. His death is described as a sacrifice in the Gospels and other books of the New Testament.  In each Gospel these five events in the life of Jesus are treated with more intense detail than any other portion of that Gospel's narrative. Scholars note that the reader receives an almost hour-by-hour account of what is happening.

After arriving at Golgotha, Jesus was offered wine mixed with myrrh or gall to drink. Both the Gospel of Mark and the Gospel of Matthew record that he refused this. He was then crucified and hung between two convicted thieves. According to some translations of the original Greek, the thieves may have been bandits or Jewish rebels. According to the Gospel of Mark, he endured the torment of crucifixion from the third hour (between approximately 9 a.m. and noon), until his death at the ninth hour, corresponding to about 3 p.m. The soldiers affixed a sign above his head stating "Jesus of Nazareth, King of the Jews" which, according to the Gospel of John, was in three languages (Hebrew, Latin, and Greek), and then divided his garments and cast lots for his seamless robe. According to the Gospel of John, the Roman soldiers did not break Jesus' legs, as they did to the two crucified thieves (breaking the legs hastened the onset of death), as Jesus was dead already. Each gospel has its own account of Jesus' last words, seven statements altogether. In the Synoptic Gospels, various supernatural events accompany the crucifixion, including darkness, an earthquake, and (in Matthew) the resurrection of saints. Following Jesus' death, his body was removed from the cross by Joseph of Arimathea and buried in a rock-hewn tomb, with Nicodemus assisting.

According to all four gospels, Jesus was brought to the "Place of a Skull" and crucified with two thieves, with the charge of claiming to be "King of the Jews", and the soldiers divided his clothes before he bowed his head and died. Following his death, Joseph of Arimathea requested the body from Pilate, which Joseph then placed in a new garden tomb.

The three Synoptic gospels also describe Simon of Cyrene bearing the cross, a crowd of people mocking Jesus along with the thieves/robbers/rebels, darkness from the 6th to the 9th hour, and the temple veil being torn from top to bottom. The Synoptic Gospels also mention several witnesses, including a centurion, and several women who watched from a distance, two of whom were present during the burial.

The Gospel of Luke is the only gospel to omit the detail of the sour wine mix that was offered to Jesus on a reed, while only Mark and John describe Joseph actually taking the body down off the cross.

There are several details that are only mentioned in a single gospel account. For instance, only the Gospel of Matthew mentions an earthquake, resurrected saints who went to the city and that Roman soldiers were assigned to guard the tomb, while Mark is the only one to state the time of the crucifixion (the third hour, or 9 a.m. – although it was probably as late as noon) and the centurion's report of Jesus' death. The Gospel of Luke's unique contributions to the narrative include Jesus' words to the women who were mourning, one criminal's rebuke of the other, the reaction of the multitudes who left "beating their breasts", and the women preparing spices and ointments before resting on the Sabbath. John is also the only one to refer to the request that the legs be broken and the soldier's subsequent piercing of Jesus' side (as fulfillment of Old Testament prophecy), as well as that Nicodemus assisted Joseph with burial.

According to the First Epistle to the Corinthians (1 Corinthians 15:4), Jesus was raised from the dead ("on the third day" counting the day of crucifixion as the first) and according to the canonical gospels, appeared to his disciples on different occasions before ascending to heaven. The account given in Acts of the Apostles says that Jesus remained with the apostles for 40 days, whereas the account in the Gospel of Luke makes no clear distinction between the events of Easter Sunday and the Ascension. Most biblical scholars agree that the author of Luke also wrote the Acts of the Apostles as a follow-up volume to the Gospel of Luke account, and the two works must be considered as a whole.

In Mark, Jesus is crucified along with two rebels, and the sun goes dark or is obscured for three hours. Jesus calls out to God, then gives a shout and dies. The curtain of the Temple is torn in two. Matthew follows Mark, but mentions an earthquake and the resurrection of saints. Luke also follows Mark, although he describes the rebels as common criminals, one of whom defends Jesus, who in turn promises that he (Jesus) and the criminal will be together in paradise. Luke portrays Jesus as impassive in the face of his crucifixion. John includes several of the same elements as those found in Mark, though they are treated differently.

Textual comparison 

The comparison below is based on the New International Version.

Other accounts and references

An early non-Christian reference to the crucifixion of Jesus is likely to be Mara Bar-Serapion's letter to his son, written some time after AD 73 but before the 3rd century AD. The letter includes no Christian themes and the author is presumed to be neither Jewish nor Christian. The letter refers to the retributions that followed the unjust treatment of three wise men: Socrates, Pythagoras, and "the wise king" of the Jews. Some scholars see little doubt that the reference to the execution of the "king of the Jews" is about the crucifixion of Jesus, while others place less value in the letter, given the ambiguity in the reference.

In the Antiquities of the Jews (written about 93 AD) Jewish historian Josephus stated (Ant 18.3) that Jesus was crucified by Pilate, writing that:
Now there was about this time Jesus, a wise man, ... He drew over to him both many of the Jews and many of the Gentiles ... And when Pilate, at the suggestion of the principal men amongst us, had condemned him to the cross ...

Most modern scholars agree that while this Josephus passage (called the Testimonium Flavianum) includes some later interpolations, it originally consisted of an authentic nucleus with a reference to the execution of Jesus by Pilate. James Dunn states that there is "broad consensus" among scholars regarding the nature of an authentic reference to the crucifixion of Jesus in the Testimonium.

Early in the second century another reference to the crucifixion of Jesus was made by Tacitus, generally considered one of the greatest Roman historians. Writing in The Annals (c. 116 AD), Tacitus described the persecution of Christians by Nero and stated (Annals 15.44) that Pilate ordered the execution of Jesus:
Nero fastened the guilt and inflicted the most exquisite tortures on a class hated for their abominations, called Christians by the populace. Christus, from whom the name had its origin, suffered the extreme penalty during the reign of Tiberius at the hands of one of our procurators, Pontius Pilatus.

Scholars generally consider the Tacitus reference to the execution of Jesus by Pilate to be genuine, and of historical value as an independent Roman source. Eddy and Boyd state that it is now "firmly established" that Tacitus provides a non-Christian confirmation of the crucifixion of Jesus.

Another possible reference to the crucifixion ("hanging", cf. ; Galatians 3:13) is found in the Babylonian Talmud:

Although the question of the equivalence of the identities of Yeshu and Jesus has at times been debated, many historians agree that the above 2nd-century passage is likely to be about Jesus, Peter Schäfer stating that there can be no doubt that this narrative of the execution in the Talmud refers to Jesus of Nazareth. Robert Van Voorst states that the Sanhedrin 43a reference to Jesus can be confirmed not only from the reference itself, but from the context that surrounds it. Sanhedrin 43a relates that Yeshu had been condemned to death by the royal government of Judea – this lineage was stripped of all legal authority upon Herod the Great's ascension to the throne in 37 BCE, meaning the execution had to have taken place close to 40 years before Jesus was even born. According to another account, he was executed on request of the Pharisees leaders.

Muslims maintain that Jesus was not crucified and that those who thought they had killed him had mistakenly killed Judas Iscariot, Simon of Cyrene, or someone else in his place. Nay, Allah raised him up unto Himself".

Some early Christian Gnostic sects, believing Jesus did not have a physical substance, denied that he was crucified. In response, Ignatius of Antioch insisted that Jesus was truly born and was truly crucified and wrote that those who held that Jesus only seemed to suffer only seemed to be Christians.

Historicity

The baptism of Jesus and his crucifixion are considered to be two historically certain facts about Jesus. James Dunn states that these "two facts in the life of Jesus command almost universal assent" and "rank so high on the 'almost impossible to doubt or deny' scale of historical facts" that they are often the starting points for the study of the historical Jesus. Bart Ehrman states that the crucifixion of Jesus on the orders of Pontius Pilate is the most certain element about him. John Dominic Crossan states that the crucifixion of Jesus is as certain as any historical fact can be. Eddy and Boyd state that it is now "firmly established" that there is non-Christian confirmation of the crucifixion of Jesus. Craig Blomberg states that most scholars in the third quest for the historical Jesus consider the crucifixion indisputable. Christopher M. Tuckett states that, although the exact reasons for the death of Jesus are hard to determine, one of the indisputable facts about him is that he was crucified.

John P. Meier views the crucifixion of Jesus as historical fact and states that Christians would not have invented the painful death of their leader, invoking the criterion of embarrassment principle in historical research. Meier states that a number of other criteria, e.g., the criterion of multiple attestation (i.e., confirmation by more than one source) and the criterion of coherence (i.e., that it fits with other historical elements) help establish the crucifixion of Jesus as a historical event.

While scholars agree on the historicity of the crucifixion, they differ on the reason and context for it. For example, both E. P. Sanders and Paula Fredriksen support the historicity of the crucifixion but contend that Jesus did not foretell his own crucifixion and that his prediction of the crucifixion is a "church creation". Geza Vermes also views the crucifixion as a historical event but provides his own explanation and background for it.

Although almost all ancient sources relating to crucifixion are literary, in 1968, an archeological discovery just northeast of Jerusalem uncovered the body of a crucified man dated to the 1st century, which provided good confirmatory evidence that crucifixions occurred during the Roman period roughly according to the manner in which the crucifixion of Jesus is described in the gospels. The crucified man was identified as Yehohanan ben Hagkol and probably died about AD 70, around the time of the Jewish revolt against Rome. The analyses at the Hadassah Medical School estimated that he died in his late 20s. Another relevant archaeological find, which also dates to the 1st century AD, is an unidentified heel bone with a spike discovered in a Jerusalem gravesite, now held by the Israel Antiquities Authority and displayed in the Israel Museum.

Details

Chronology

There is no consensus regarding the exact date of the crucifixion of Jesus, although it is generally agreed by biblical scholars that it was on a Friday on or near Passover (Nisan 14), during the governorship of Pontius Pilate (who ruled AD 26–36). Various approaches have been used to estimate the year of the crucifixion, including the canonical Gospels, the chronology of the life of Paul, as well as different astronomical models. Scholars have provided estimates in the range 30–33 AD, with Rainer Riesner stating that "the fourteenth of Nisan (7 April) of the year A.D. 30 is, apparently in the opinion of the majority of contemporary scholars as well, far and away the most likely date of the crucifixion of Jesus." Another preferred date  among scholars is Friday, April 3, 33 AD.

The consensus of scholarship is that the New Testament accounts represent a crucifixion occurring on a Friday, but a Thursday or Wednesday crucifixion have also been proposed. Some scholars explain a Thursday crucifixion based on a "double sabbath" caused by an extra Passover sabbath falling on Thursday dusk to Friday afternoon, ahead of the normal weekly Sabbath. Some have argued that Jesus was crucified on Wednesday, not Friday, on the grounds of the mention of "three days and three nights" in  before his resurrection, celebrated on Sunday. Others have countered by saying that this ignores the Jewish idiom by which a "day and night" may refer to any part of a 24-hour period, that the expression in Matthew is idiomatic, not a statement that Jesus was 72 hours in the tomb, and that the many references to a resurrection on the third day do not require three literal nights.

In Mark 15:25 crucifixion takes place at the third hour (9 a.m.) and Jesus' death at the ninth hour (3 p.m.). In John 19:14 Jesus is still before Pilate at the sixth hour. Scholars have presented a number of arguments to deal with the issue, some suggesting a reconciliation, e.g., based on the use of Roman timekeeping in John, since Roman timekeeping began at midnight and this would mean being before Pilate at the 6th hour was 6 a.m., yet others have rejected the arguments. Several scholars have argued that the modern precision of marking the time of day should not be read back into the gospel accounts, written at a time when no standardization of timepieces, or exact recording of hours and minutes was available, and time was often approximated to the closest three-hour period.

Path

The three Synoptic Gospels refer to a man called Simon of Cyrene whom the Roman soldiers order to carry the cross after Jesus initially carries it but then collapses, while the Gospel of John just says that Jesus "bears" his own cross. 

Luke's gospel also describes an interaction between Jesus and the women among the crowd of mourners following him, quoting Jesus as saying "Daughters of Jerusalem, do not weep for me, but weep for yourselves and for your children. For behold, the days are coming when they will say, 'Blessed are the barren and the wombs that never bore and the breasts that never nursed!' Then they will begin to say to the mountains, 'Fall on us,' and to the hills, 'Cover us.' For if they do these things when the wood is green, what will happen when it is dry?"

The Gospel of Luke has Jesus address these women as "daughters of Jerusalem", thus distinguishing them from the women whom the same gospel describes as "the women who had followed him from Galilee" and who were present at his crucifixion.

Traditionally, the path that Jesus took is called Via Dolorosa (Latin for "Way of Grief" or "Way of Suffering") and is a street in the Old City of Jerusalem. It is marked by nine of the fourteen Stations of the Cross. It passes the Ecce Homo Church and the last five stations are inside the Church of the Holy Sepulchre.

There is no reference to a woman named Veronica in the Gospels, but sources such as Acta Sanctorum describe her as a pious woman of Jerusalem who, moved with pity as Jesus carried his cross to Golgotha, gave him her veil that he might wipe his forehead.

Location

Eusebius identified its location only as being north of Mount Zion, which is consistent with the two most popularly suggested sites of modern times.

The text does not indicate why it was so designated, but several theories have been put forward. One is that as a place of public execution, Calvary may have been strewn with the skulls of abandoned victims (which would be contrary to Jewish burial traditions, but not Roman). Another is that Calvary is named after a nearby cemetery (which is consistent with both of the proposed modern sites). A third is that the name was derived from the physical contour, which would be more consistent with the singular use of the word, i.e., the place of "a skull". While often referred to as "Mount Calvary", it was more likely a small hill or rocky knoll.

The traditional site, inside what is now occupied by the Church of the Holy Sepulchre in the Christian Quarter of the Old City, has been attested since the 4th century. A second site (commonly referred to as Gordon's Calvary ), located further north of the Old City near a place popularly called the Garden Tomb, has been promoted since the 19th century.

People present

The Gospel of Matthew describes many women at the crucifixion, some of whom are named in the Gospels. Aside from these women, the three Synoptic Gospels speak of the presence of others: "the chief priests, with the scribes and elders"; two robbers crucified, one on Jesus' right and one on his left, whom the Gospel of Luke presents as the penitent thief and the impenitent thief; "the soldiers", "the centurion and those who were with him, keeping watch over Jesus"; passers-by; "bystanders", "the crowds that had assembled for this spectacle"; and "his acquaintances".

The Gospel of John also speaks of women present, but only mentions the soldiers and "the disciple whom Jesus loved".

The Gospels also tell of the arrival, after the death of Jesus, of Joseph of Arimathea and of Nicodemus.

Method and manner

Whereas most Christians believe the gibbet on which Jesus was executed was the traditional two-beamed cross, the Jehovah's Witnesses hold the view that a single upright stake was used. The Greek and Latin words used in the earliest Christian writings are ambiguous. The latter means wood (a live tree, timber or an object constructed of wood); in earlier forms of Greek, the former term meant an upright stake or pole, but in Koine Greek it was used also to mean a cross. The Latin word  was also applied to objects other than a cross.

Early Christian writers who speak of the shape of the particular gibbet on which Jesus died invariably describe it as having a cross-beam. Justin Martyr (100–165) explicitly says the cross of Christ was of two-beam shape: "That lamb which was commanded to be wholly roasted was a symbol of the suffering of the cross which Christ would undergo. For the lamb, which is roasted, is roasted and dressed up in the form of the cross. For one spit is transfixed right through from the lower parts up to the head, and one across the back, to which are attached the legs of the lamb." Irenaeus, who died around the end of the 2nd century, speaks of the cross as having "five extremities, two in length, two in breadth, and one in the middle, on which [last] the person rests who is fixed by the nails."

The assumption of the use of a two-beamed cross does not determine the number of nails used in the crucifixion and some theories suggest three nails while others suggest four nails. Throughout history, larger numbers of nails have been hypothesized, at times as high as 14 nails. These variations are also present in the artistic depictions of the crucifixion. In the Western Church, before the Renaissance usually four nails would be depicted, with the feet side by side. After the Renaissance most depictions use three nails, with one foot placed on the other. Nails are almost always depicted in art, although Romans sometimes just tied the victims to the cross. The tradition also carries to Christian emblems, e.g. the Jesuits use three nails under the IHS monogram and a cross to symbolize the crucifixion.

The placing of the nails in the hands, or the wrists is also uncertain. Some theories suggest that the Greek word  for hand includes the wrist and that the Romans were generally trained to place nails through Destot's space (between the capitate and lunate bones) without fracturing any bones. Another theory suggests that the Greek word for hand also includes the forearm and that the nails were placed near the radius and ulna of the forearm. Ropes may have also been used to fasten the hands in addition to the use of nails.

Another issue of debate has been the use of a hypopodium as a standing platform to support the feet, given that the hands may not have been able to support the weight. In the 17th century Rasmus Bartholin considered a number of analytical scenarios of that topic. In the 20th century, forensic pathologist Frederick Zugibe performed a number of crucifixion experiments by using ropes to hang human subjects at various angles and hand positions. His experiments support an angled suspension, and a two-beamed cross, and perhaps some form of foot support, given that in an  form of suspension from a straight stake (as used by the Nazis in the Dachau concentration camp during World War II), death comes rather quickly.

Words of Jesus spoken from the cross

The Gospels describe various last words that Jesus said while on the cross, as follows:

Mark / Matthew
    (Aramaic for "My God, My God, why have you forsaken me?"). Aramaic linguist Steve Caruso said Jesus most likely spoke Galilean Aramaic, which would render the pronunciation of these words: .

The only words of Jesus on the cross mentioned in the Mark and Matthew accounts, this is a quotation of Psalm 22. Since other verses of the same Psalm are cited in the crucifixion accounts, some commentators consider it a literary and theological creation. Geza Vermes noted the verse is cited in Aramaic rather than the usual Hebrew, and that by the time of Jesus, this phrase had become a proverbial saying in common usage. Compared to the accounts in the other Gospels, which he describes as 'theologically correct and reassuring', he considers this phrase 'unexpected, disquieting and in consequence more probable'. He describes it as bearing 'all the appearances of a genuine cry'. Raymond Brown likewise comments that he finds 'no persuasive argument against attributing to the Jesus of Mark/Matt the literal sentiment of feeling forsaken expressed in the Psalm quote'.

Luke
 "Father, forgive them; for they do not know what they are doing." [Some early manuscripts do not have this]
 "Truly I tell you, today you will be with me in Paradise."
 "Father, into your hands I commend my spirit."

The Gospel of Luke does not include the aforementioned exclamation of Jesus mentioned in Matthew and Mark.

John
 "Woman, here is your son."
 "I am thirsty."
 "It is finished."

The words of Jesus on the cross, especially his last words, have been the subject of a wide range of Christian teachings and sermons, and a number of authors have written books specifically devoted to the last sayings of Christ.

Reported extraordinary occurrences
The synoptics report various miraculous events during the crucifixion.  Mark mentions a period of darkness in the daytime during Jesus' crucifixion, and the Temple veil being torn in two when Jesus dies. Luke follows Mark; as does Matthew, additionally mentioning an earthquake and the resurrection of dead saints. No mention of any of these appears in John.

Darkness

In the synoptic narrative, while Jesus is hanging on the cross, the sky over Judea (or the whole world) is "darkened for three hours," from the sixth to the ninth hour (noon to mid-afternoon). There is no reference to darkness in the Gospel of John account, in which the crucifixion does not take place until after noon.

Some ancient Christian writers considered the possibility that pagan commentators may have mentioned this event and mistook it for a solar eclipse, pointing out that an eclipse could not occur during the Passover, which takes place during the full moon when the moon is opposite the sun rather than in front of it. Christian traveler and historian Sextus Julius Africanus and Christian theologian Origen refer to Greek historian Phlegon, who lived in the 2nd century AD, as having written "with regard to the eclipse in the time of Tiberius Caesar, in whose reign Jesus appears to have been crucified, and the great earthquakes which then took place".

Sextus Julius Africanus further refers to the writings of historian Thallus: "This darkness Thallus, in the third book of his History, calls, as appears to me without reason, an eclipse of the sun. For the Hebrews celebrate the passover on the 14th day according to the moon, and the passion of our Saviour falls on the day before the passover; but an eclipse of the sun takes place only when the moon comes under the sun." Christian apologist Tertullian believed the event was documented in the Roman archives.

Colin Humphreys and W. G. Waddington of Oxford University considered the possibility that a lunar, rather than solar, eclipse might have taken place. They concluded that such an eclipse would have been visible for 30 minutes in Jerusalem and suggested the gospel reference to a solar eclipse was the result of a scribe wrongly amending a text. Historian David Henige dismisses this explanation as 'indefensible' and astronomer Bradley Schaefer points out that the lunar eclipse would not have been visible during daylight hours.

In an edition of the BBC Radio 4 programme In Our Time entitled Eclipses, Frank Close, Emeritus Professor of Physics at the University of Oxford, stated that certain historical sources say that on the night of the Crucifixion "the moon had risen blood red," which indicates a lunar eclipse. He went on to confirm that as Passover takes place on the full moon calculating back shows that a lunar eclipse did in fact take place on the night of Passover on Friday 3 April 33AD which would have been visible in the area of modern Israel, ancient Judea, just after sunset.

Modern biblical scholarship treats the account in the synoptic gospels as a literary creation by the author of the Mark Gospel, amended in the Luke and Matthew accounts, intended to heighten the importance of what they saw as a theologically significant event, and not intended to be taken literally. This image of darkness over the land would have been understood by ancient readers, a typical element in the description of the death of kings and other major figures by writers such as Philo, Dio Cassius, Virgil, Plutarch and Josephus. Géza Vermes describes the darkness account as typical of "Jewish eschatological imagery of the day of the Lord", and says that those interpreting it as a datable eclipse are "barking up the wrong tree".

Temple veil, earthquake and resurrection of dead saints

The synoptic gospels state that the veil of the temple was torn from top to bottom.

The Gospel of Matthew mentions an account of earthquakes, rocks splitting, and the opening of the graves of dead saints, and describes how these resurrected saints went into the holy city and appeared to many people.

In the Mark and Matthew accounts, the centurion in charge comments on the events: "Truly this man was the Son of God!" or "Truly this was the Son of God!". The Gospel of Luke quotes him as saying, "Certainly this man was innocent!"

The historian Sextus Julius Africanus in the early third century wrote, describing the day of the crucifixion, "A most terrible darkness fell over all the world, the rocks were torn apart by an earthquake, and many places both in Judaea and the rest of the world were thrown down. In the third book of his Histories, Thallos dismisses this darkness as a solar eclipse. ..."

A widespread 6.3 magnitude earthquake has been confirmed to have taken place between 26 and 36 AD. This earthquake was dated by counting varves (annual layers of sediment) between the disruptions in a core of sediment from En Gedi caused by it and by an earlier known quake in 31 BC. The authors concluded that either this was the earthquake in Matthew and it occurred more or less as reported, or else Matthew "borrowed" this earthquake which actually occurred at another time or simply inserted an "allegorical fiction".

Medical aspects

A number of theories to explain the circumstances of the death of Jesus on the cross have been proposed by physicians and Biblical scholars. In 2006, Matthew W. Maslen and Piers D. Mitchell reviewed over 40 publications on the subject with theories ranging from cardiac rupture to pulmonary embolism.

In 1847, based on the reference in the Gospel of John to blood and water coming out when Jesus' side was pierced with a spear, physician William Stroud proposed the ruptured heart theory of the cause of Christ's death which influenced a number of other people.

The cardiovascular collapse theory is a prevalent modern explanation and suggests that Jesus died of profound shock. According to this theory, the scourging, the beatings, and the fixing to the cross left Jesus dehydrated, weak, and critically ill and that this led to cardiovascular collapse.

Writing in the Journal of the American Medical Association, physician William Edwards and his colleagues supported the combined cardiovascular collapse (via hypovolemic shock) and exhaustion asphyxia theories, assuming that the flow of water from the side of Jesus described in the Gospel of John was pericardial fluid.

In his book The Crucifixion of Jesus, physician and forensic pathologist Frederick Zugibe studied the likely circumstances of the death of Jesus in great detail. Zugibe carried out a number of experiments over several years to test his theories while he was a medical examiner. These studies included experiments in which volunteers with specific weights were hanging at specific angles and the amount of pull on each hand was measured, in cases where the feet were also secured or not. In these cases the amount of pull and the corresponding pain was found to be significant.

Pierre Barbet, a French physician, and the chief surgeon at Saint Joseph's Hospital in Paris, hypothesized that Jesus relaxed his muscles to obtain enough air to utter his last words, in the face of exhaustion asphyxia. Some of Barbet's theories, such as the location of nails, are disputed by Zugibe.

Orthopedic surgeon Keith Maxwell not only analyzed the medical aspects of the crucifixion, but also looked back at how Jesus could have carried the cross all the way along Via Dolorosa.

In 2003, historians F. P. Retief and L. Cilliers reviewed the history and pathology of crucifixion as performed by the Romans and suggested that the cause of death was often a combination of factors. They also state that Roman guards were prohibited from leaving the scene until death had occurred.

Theological significance

Christians believe that Jesus' death was instrumental in restoring humankind to relationship with God. Christians believe that through Jesus' death and resurrection people are reunited with God and receive new joy and power in this life as well as eternal life. Thus the crucifixion of Jesus along with his resurrection restores access to a vibrant experience of God's presence, love and grace as well as the confidence of eternal life.

Christology

The accounts of the crucifixion and subsequent resurrection of Jesus provide a rich background for Christological analysis, from the canonical Gospels to the Pauline epistles. Christians believe Jesus' suffering was foretold in the Old Testament, such as in Psalm 22, and Isaiah 53 prophecy of the suffering servant.

In Johannine "agent Christology" the submission of Jesus to crucifixion is a sacrifice made as an agent of God or servant of God, for the sake of eventual victory. This builds on the salvific theme of the Gospel of John which begins in John 1:29 with John the Baptist's proclamation: "The Lamb of God who takes away the sins of the world". 

A central element in the Christology presented in the Acts of the Apostles is the affirmation of the belief that the death of Jesus by crucifixion happened "with the foreknowledge of God, according to a definite plan". In this view, as in Acts 2:23, the cross is not viewed as a scandal, for the crucifixion of Jesus "at the hands of the lawless" is viewed as the fulfillment of the plan of God.

Paul's Christology has a specific focus on the death and resurrection of Jesus. For Paul, the crucifixion of Jesus is directly related to his resurrection and the term "the cross of Christ" used in Galatians 6:12 may be viewed as his abbreviation of the message of the gospels. For Paul, the crucifixion of Jesus was not an isolated event in history, but a cosmic event with significant eschatological consequences, as in 1 Corinthians 2:8. In the Pauline view, Jesus, obedient to the point of death (Philippians 2:8) died "at the right time" (Romans 4:25) based on the plan of God. For Paul the "power of the cross" is not separable from the resurrection of Jesus.  Furthermore, Paul highlighted the idea that Jesus on the cross defeated the spiritual forces of evil "Kosmokrator", literally 'the rulers of this world' (used in plural in Ephesians 6:12), thus highlighting the idea of victory of light over darkness, or good over evil, through Christ. 

Belief in the redemptive nature of Jesus' death predates the Pauline letters, to the earliest days of Christianity and the Jerusalem church. The Nicene Creed's statement that "for our sake he was crucified" is a reflection of this core belief's formalization in the fourth century.

John Calvin supported the "agent of God" Christology and argued that in his trial in Pilate's Court Jesus could have successfully argued for his innocence, but instead submitted to crucifixion in obedience to the Father. This Christological theme continued into the 20th century, both in the Eastern and Western Churches. In the Eastern Church Sergei Bulgakov argued that the crucifixion of Jesus was "pre-eternally" determined by the Father before the creation of the world, to redeem humanity from the disgrace caused by the fall of Adam. In the Western Church, Karl Rahner elaborated on the analogy that the blood of the Lamb of God (and the water from the side of Jesus) shed at the crucifixion had a cleansing nature, similar to baptismal water.

Atonement 

Jesus' death and resurrection underpin a variety of theological interpretations as to how salvation is granted to humanity. These interpretations vary widely in how much emphasis they place on the death of Jesus as compared to his words. According to the substitutionary atonement view, Jesus' death is of central importance, and Jesus willingly sacrificed himself as an act of perfect obedience as a sacrifice of love which pleased God. By contrast the moral influence theory of atonement focuses much more on the moral content of Jesus' teaching, and sees Jesus' death as a martyrdom. Since the Middle Ages there has been conflict between these two views within Western Christianity. Evangelical Protestants typically hold a substitutionary view and in particular hold to the theory of penal substitution. Liberal Protestants typically reject substitutionary atonement and hold to the moral influence theory of atonement. Both views are popular within the Roman Catholic Church, with the satisfaction doctrine incorporated into the idea of penance.

In the Roman Catholic tradition this view of atonement is balanced by the duty of Roman Catholics to perform Acts of Reparation to Jesus Christ which in the encyclical Miserentissimus Redemptor of Pope Pius XI were defined as "some sort of compensation to be rendered for the injury" with respect to the sufferings of Jesus. Pope John Paul II referred to these acts of reparation as the "unceasing effort to stand beside the endless crosses on which the Son of God continues to be crucified."

Among Eastern Orthodox Christians, another common view is Christus Victor. This holds that Jesus was sent by God to defeat death and Satan. Because of his perfection, voluntary death, and resurrection, Jesus defeated Satan and death, and arose victorious. Therefore, humanity was no longer bound in sin, but was free to rejoin God through the repentance of sin and faith in Jesus.

The Church of Jesus Christ of Latter-day Saints teaches that the crucifixion of Jesus was part of the atonement and a "redeeming ransom" both for the effect of the fall of Adam upon all humankind and "for the personal sins of all who repent, from Adam to the end of the world."

Deicide 
The Catholic Church denounces Jewish deicide, believing that all sinners are the authors and ministers of Jesus' crucifixion.

Denial

Docetism
In Christianity, docetism is the doctrine that the phenomenon of Jesus, his historical and bodily existence, and above all the human form of Jesus, was mere semblance without any true reality. Docetists denied that Jesus could have truly suffered and died, as his physical body was illusory, and instead saw the crucifixion as something that only appeared to happen.

Nag Hammadi manuscripts
According to the First Revelation of James in the Nag Hammadi library, Jesus appeared to James after apparently being crucified and stated that another person had been inflicted in his place:

Islam

All Islamic traditions categorically  deny that Jesus physically died, either on a cross or another manner.

The below Quranic verse says Jesus was neither killed nor crucified:

Islamic traditions teach that Jesus ascended to Heaven without being put on the cross, but that God transformed another person to appear exactly like him and to be then crucified instead of him. This view is attested in an account by Irenaeus of the doctrine of the 2nd-century Alexandrian Gnostic Basilides in which Irenaeus refutes what he believes to be a heresy denying the death.

Gnosticism 
Some scriptures identified as Gnostic reject the atonement of Jesus' death by distinguishing the earthly body of Jesus and his divine and immaterial essence. According to the Second Treatise of the Great Seth, Yaldabaoth (the Creator of the material universe) and his Archons tried to kill Jesus by crucifixion, but only killed their own man (that is the body). While Jesus ascended from his body, Yaldabaoth and his followers thought Jesus to be dead. In Apocalypse of Peter, Peter talks with the savior whom the "priests and people" believed to have killed.

Manichaeism, which was influenced by Gnostic ideas, adhered to the idea that not Jesus, but somebody else was crucified instead. Jesus suffering on the cross is depicted as the state of light particles (spirit) within matter instead.

According to Bogomilism, the crucifixion was an attempt by Lucifer to destroy Jesus, while the earthly Jesus was regarded as a prophet, Jesus himself was an immaterial being that can not be killed. Accordingly, Lucifer failed and Jesus' sufferings on the cross were only an illusion.

Others 
According to some Christian sects in Japan, Jesus Christ did not die on the cross at Golgotha. Instead his younger brother, Isukiri, took his place on the cross, while Jesus fled across Siberia to Mutsu Province, in northern Japan. Once in Japan, he became a rice farmer, married, and raised a family with three daughters near what is now Shingō. While in Japan, it is asserted that he traveled, learned, and eventually died at the age of 106. His body was exposed on a hilltop for four years. According to the customs of the time, Jesus' bones were collected, bundled, and buried in a mound. There is also a museum in Japan which claims to have evidence of these claims.

In Yazidism, Jesus is thought of as a "figure of light" who could not be crucified. This interpretation could be taken from the Quran or Gnostics.

In art, symbolism and devotions

Since the crucifixion of Jesus, the cross has become a key element of Christian symbolism, and the crucifixion scene has been a key element of Christian art, giving rise to specific artistic themes such as Ecce Homo, The Raising of the Cross, Descent from the Cross and Entombment of Christ.

The Crucifixion, seen from the Cross by Tissot presented a novel approach at the end of the 19th century, in which the crucifixion scene was portrayed from the perspective of Jesus.

The symbolism of the cross which is today one of the most widely recognized Christian symbols was used from the earliest Christian times and Justin Martyr who died in 165 describes it in a way that already implies its use as a symbol, although the crucifix appeared later. Masters such as Caravaggio, Rubens and Titian have all depicted the crucifixion scene in their works.

Devotions based on the process of crucifixion, and the sufferings of Jesus are followed by various Christians. The Stations of the Cross follows a number of stages based on the stages involved in the crucifixion of Jesus, while the Rosary of the Holy Wounds is used to meditate on the wounds of Jesus as part of the crucifixion.

The presence of the Virgin Mary under the cross has in itself been the subject of Marian art, and well known Catholic symbolism such as the Miraculous Medal and Pope John Paul II's Coat of Arms bearing a Marian Cross. And a number of Marian devotions also involve the presence of the Virgin Mary in Calvary, e.g., Pope John Paul II stated that "Mary was united to Jesus on the Cross". Well known works of Christian art by masters such as Raphael (e.g., the Mond Crucifixion), and Caravaggio (e.g., his Entombment) depict the Virgin Mary as part of the crucifixion scene.

See also

 The penitent thief and impenitent thief, crucified alongside Jesus
 Descriptions in antiquity of the execution cross
 Empty tomb
 Feast of the Cross
 Feast of the Sacred Heart
 Life of Jesus in the New Testament
 Seven Sorrows of Mary
 Swoon hypothesis
 Depictions of Jesus

References

Further reading

External links

 
1st century in Jerusalem
30s in the Roman Empire
Christology
Jesus and history
Passion of Jesus
Public executions
Sorrowful Mysteries
Stations of the Cross
Seven Sorrows of Mary